Shacklefords Fork is an unincorporated community in King and Queen County, Virginia, United States. The community takes its name from the Shackleford family of Shacklefords, Virginia, nearby in King and Queen County.

References

Unincorporated communities in Virginia
Unincorporated communities in King and Queen County, Virginia